United Nations Security Council Resolution 204, adopted unanimously on May 19, 1965, after a complaint by Senegal against Portugal, the Council deplored incursions by the Portuguese Armed Forces into Senegalese territory and requested that they take whatever measures necessary to assure Senegal's territorial integrity.

See also
List of United Nations Security Council Resolutions 201 to 300 (1965–1971)
Portuguese Empire
United Nations Security Council Resolution 178

References
Text of the Resolution at undocs.org

External links
 

 0204
 0204
 0204
 0204
1965 in Portuguese Guinea
1965 in Portugal
1965 in Senegal
May 1965 events